Miha Lapornik (born 18 October 1993) is a Slovenian professional basketball player who plays for Patrioti Levice of the Slovak Basketball League.

Professional career
Lapornik started playing professional basketball for Zlatorog Laško.

On 27 July 2015, Lapornik signed  a three-year contract with Union Olimpija.

In July 2016, he parted ways with Union Olimpija and signed a one-year contract with an option to extend it for one more year with Spanish team Bilbao Basket .

In October 2017, he signed an open contract with Zlatorog Laško.

In January 2018, Lapornik signed with U-Banca Transilvania Cluj-Napoca out of Romania.

On 26 June 2018, he signed a contract with Petrol Olimpija.

He spent the 2019–20 season with Pieno žvaigždės in Lithuania, averaging 13.3 points per game. 

On 25 July 2020, Lapornik signed with Heroes Den Bosch until 2022. He was named to the All-DBL Team for the 2021–22 season.

On 5 July 2021, Heroes announced Lapornik had signed with DEAC in Hungary. He was offered a better contract, allowing him to leave early out of his contract.

After a brief spell with Zlatorog in January 2022, where he stayed for only nine days and played one match, Lapornik joined the ABA League team Krka on 14 January 2022.

In summer 2022, he signed with Patrioti Levice of the Slovak Basketball League.

International career
Lapornik made his debut for the Slovenian national team on 31 August 2016, in the EuroBasket 2017 qualification game against Kosovo.

References

External links
 Union Olimpija profile
 Eurobasket.com profile

1993 births
Living people
ABA League players
BC Pieno žvaigždės players
Bilbao Basket players
BK Patrioti Levice players
CS Universitatea Cluj-Napoca (men's basketball) players
Dutch Basketball League players
Heroes Den Bosch players
KK Krka players
KK Olimpija players
KK Zlatorog Laško players
Liga ACB players
Shooting guards
Slovenian expatriate basketball people in Lithuania
Slovenian expatriate basketball people in Spain
Slovenian expatriate sportspeople in Hungary
Slovenian expatriate sportspeople in Romania
Slovenian expatriate sportspeople in Slovakia
Slovenian expatriate sportspeople in the Netherlands
Slovenian men's basketball players
Sportspeople from Celje